Odysseu Guy Ramos (born 16 August 1985) is a professional footballer who plays as a centre-back for FC Maense. Born in the Netherlands, he represented the Cape Verde national team at international level.

Career
Born in Rotterdam, Ramos has played club football for FC Dordrecht and RKC Waalwijk, before he signed with Roda JC Kerkrade from July 2013.

Despite being born in the Netherlands, Ramos qualifies for Cape Verde through parentage and received his first national team call-up in May 2008. He made his international debut in a friendly match against Luxembourg on 27 May 2008. He was named in the Cape Verde squad for the 2013 Africa Cup of Nations, and spoke about his confidence in the team before the tournament began.
In 2014 Ramos sexually assaulted Aron Jóhannsson of AZ Alkmaar during a game.

After a knee injury curtailed his career, Ramos spent two years as a free agent and spent time at the Team VVCS training camp. He signed for Chabab Rif Al Hoceima of the Botola in Morocco in July 2018.

Honours
RKC Waalwijk:
Eerste Divisie: 2010–11

References

External links
 

1985 births
Living people
Dutch sportspeople of Cape Verdean descent
Cape Verdean footballers
Dutch footballers
Footballers from Rotterdam
Association football central defenders
Cape Verde international footballers
Eredivisie players
Eerste Divisie players
FC Dordrecht players
RKC Waalwijk players
Roda JC Kerkrade players
Chabab Rif Al Hoceima players
Almere City FC players
2013 Africa Cup of Nations players
Cape Verdean expatriate footballers
Dutch expatriate footballers
Dutch expatriate sportspeople in Morocco
Cape Verdean expatriate sportspeople in Morocco
Expatriate footballers in Morocco